This article lists the public art of the Haute-Corse, in Corsica.

List

See also
 List of public art in Corse-du-Sud

References

External links

 

Public art